Letting the cat out of the bag (also ...box) is a colloquialism meaning to reveal facts previously hidden. It could refer to revealing a conspiracy (friendly or not) to its target, letting an outsider into an inner circle of knowledge (e.g., explaining an in-joke) or the revelation of a plot twist in a movie or play. It is also known as to reveal a secret carelessly or by mistake.

Etymology
The derivation of the phrase is not clear. One suggestion is that the phrase refers to the whip-like "cat o'nine tails", an instrument of punishment once used on Royal Navy vessels. The instrument was purportedly stored in a red sack, and a sailor who revealed the transgressions of another would be "letting the cat out of the bag". Another suggested derivation is from the "pig in a poke" scam, where a customer buying a suckling pig in a sack would actually be sold a (less valuable) cat, and would not realise the deception until the bag was opened. Johannes Agricola made reference to the expression "let the cat out of the bag" in a letter to Martin Luther on 4 May 1530 as referenced in Lyndal Roper's 2016 biography about Martin Luther.

Both of these suggestions are rejected by Snopes.com, who find no evidence of it originating in naval slang, nor of whips being stored in sacks, and consider it "nigh on impossible to mistake a cat for a pig".

References

English phrases
Metaphors referring to cats